Irab (also Romanized as Īrāb or Irâb) is a village in Emam Rural District, Ziviyeh District, Saqqez County, Kurdistan Province, Iran. At the 2006 census, its population was 117, in 26 families. The village is populated by Kurds.

References 

Towns and villages in Saqqez County
Kurdish settlements in Kurdistan Province